The southern Indian state of Karnataka consists of 31 districts grouped into 4 administrative divisions, viz., Belagavi, Bangalore, Gulbarga, and Mysore. Geographically, the state has three principal variants: the western coastal stretch, the hilly belt comprising the Western Ghats, and the plains, comprising the plains of the Deccan plateau.

History

Karnataka took its present shape in 1956, when the former states of Mysore and Coorg were unified into a linguistically homogenous Kannada-speaking state along with agglomeration of districts of the former states of Bombay, Hyderabad, and Madras as part of the States Reorganisation Act of 1956. The unified Mysore State was made up of ten districts, viz., Bangalore, Kolar, Tumkur, Mandya, Mysore, Hassan, Chikkamagalur , Shimoga, Chitradurga, and Ballari which had been transferred from Madras Presidency to Mysore State earlier in 1953, when the new state of Andhra Pradesh was created out of Madras' northern districts. Coorg State became Kodagu district, South Canara was transferred from Madras State, North Canara, Dharwad, Belgaum, and Bijapur from Bombay State. Bidar, Gulbarga, and Raichur from Hyderabad State. The received its new name of Karnataka in the year 1973.

Formations of districts 

Currently there are demands to carve out the following district,
 Bailhongal ,Kittur, Chikkodi and Gokak from Belagavi (largest district)
Tipaturu and Madhugiri from Tumakuru
Sirsi from Uttara Kannada
Putturu from Dakshina Kannada
Hunasuru from Mysuru
Jamakhandi from Bagalkote
Indi from Vijayapura
Sedam from Kalaburagi
Sindhanuru from Raichuru

Administrative structure

A district of an Indian state is an administrative geographical unit, headed by a District Commissioner, an officer belonging to the Indian Administrative Service selected through the UPSC examination. The district commissioner is assisted by a number of officers belonging to the Karnataka Administrative Service selected through the KPSC examination.

A Superintendent of Police (India), usually an officer belonging to the Indian Police Service selected through the UPSC examination. is entrusted with the responsibility of maintaining law and order and related issues of the district. He is assisted by the officers of the Karnataka Police Service and other Karnataka Police officials. Big cities like Bengaluru, Belagavi, Hubballi-Dharwad, Kalaburagi, Mangaluru and Mysuru are headed by a Commissioner of Police holding the rank of Additional Director General of Police(ADGP) for Bengaluru, Inspector General of Police (IGP) for Mysuru and Deputy Inspector General of Police (DIG) for Belagavi, Hubballi-Dharwad, Kalaburagi and Mangaluru. They are assisted by officers belonging to the Karnataka Police Service selected through the KPSC examination.

A Deputy Conservator of Forests, an officer belonging to the Indian Forest Service selected through the UPSC examination is responsible for managing the forests, the environment and wildlife of the district. He is assisted by the officers of the Karnataka Forest Service selected through the KPSC examination.

Sect-oral development is looked after by the district head of each development department such as Public Works, Health, Education, Agriculture, Animal husbandry, etc. These officers belong to the various state services.

Administrative divisions

Alphabetical listing of districts

See also 
 List of taluks of Karnataka

References

External links

Districts
Karnataka